Broselow is a surname. Notable people with the surname include:

Ellen Broselow (born 1949), American experimental linguist 
James Broselow (born 1943), American emergency physician, academic, inventor, and entrepreneur